1866 was the 80th season of cricket in England since the foundation of Marylebone Cricket Club (MCC). The highlight was the emergence of W. G. Grace as the game's leading batsman with the highest first-class score since William Ward's innings in 1820. James Southerton emerged as an outstanding bowler and the first known "century before lunch" was scored.

Events
 30–31 July: W. G. Grace at the age of eighteen played an innings of 224 not out which was the highest first-class score since William Ward's record 278 for MCC against Norfolk in 1820.
 21 August: John Sewell was the first batsman to score a century before the luncheon interval when he advanced from 29 not out to 166 for Middlesex against Surrey at The Oval.

Playing record (by county)

Leading batsmen (qualification 10 innings)

Leading bowlers (qualification 800 balls)

References

Annual reviews
 John Lillywhite's Cricketer’s Companion (Green Lilly), Lillywhite, 1867
 Arthur Haygarth, Scores & Biographies, Volume 9 (1865–1866), Lillywhite, 1867

External links
 CricketArchive – season summaries

1866 in English cricket
English cricket seasons in the 19th century